The Tartan 27-2 is an American trailerable sailboat that was designed by Sparkman & Stephens as a cruiser and first built in 1976.

The Tartan 27-2 is a development of the Tartan 27 sloop and the Tartan 27 Yawl, with a raised sheer line, redesigned coach house and interior changes.

Production
The boat was built by Tartan Marine, in Painesville, Ohio, from 1976 until 1979, with 64 boats completed.

Design
The Tartan 27-2 is a recreational keelboat, built predominantly of fiberglass, with wood trim. It has a masthead sloop rig or optional yawl rig, a raked stem, an angled transom, a keel-mounted rudder controlled by a tiller and a fixed modified long keel with a cutaway forefoot and a retractable centerboard. It displaces  and carries  of ballast.

The design has sleeping accommodation for four people, with a double "V"-berth in the bow cabin and two straight settees in the main cabin on either wise of a drop-down dinette table. The galley is located on the starboard side just forward of the companionway ladder. The galley is "L"-shaped and is equipped with a two-burner stove, an ice box and a sink. A navigation station is opposite the galley, on the port side. The head is located just aft of the bow cabin on the port side.

Operational history
In a review for Boats.com, Charles Doane wrote, "the revised accommodation plan on the 27-2 (as it was designated) is more conventional and liveable, with an aft galley opposite an icebox/nav desk, two long settees between a fold-down table, plus a larger athwartship head. The great drawback to the 27-2 ... is that--to my eye, at least--it is not nearly as attractive and shippy looking as the original. Also, raising the sheer without changing the hull mold required a much more vulnerable outward-facing deck joint."

See also
List of sailing boat types

Related development
Tartan 27
Tartan 27 Yawl

References

External links

Keelboats
1970s sailboat type designs
Sailing yachts
Trailer sailers
Sailboat type designs by Sparkman and Stephens
Sailboat types built by Tartan Marine